The New York Times Crosswords is a video game released on May 22, 2007, for the Nintendo DS.

Features 
Use the stylus to write the letters using handwriting recognition, with keyboard optional.
1,000 puzzles with varying levels of difficulty based on days of the week (Mondays being the easiest and Sundays, the hardest).
Wireless allows up to 4 players to compete or work as a team to complete puzzles.

Reception
Nintendo World Report rated NYTC a 9.0

External links
IGN Review on "The New York Times Crosswords"
 NY times mini crossword

2007 video games
Crosswords
Majesco Entertainment games
The New York Times
Nintendo DS games
Nintendo DS-only games
Puzzle video games
Video games developed in the United States
Crossword video games
Budcat Creations games
Multiplayer and single-player video games